Butta Gadzhiyevich Magomedov (born 25 December 1997) is a Russian football player who plays for FC Khimki.

Club career
He made his debut in the Russian Football National League for FC Alania Vladikavkaz on 1 August 2020 in a game against FC SKA-Khabarovsk, as a starter.

On 5 February 2022, Magomedov signed with Russian Premier League club FC Khimki. He made his RPL debut for Khimki on 6 March 2022 against FC Lokomotiv Moscow.

Career statistics

References

External links
 
 Profile by Russian Football National League
 

1997 births
Footballers from Makhachkala
Living people
Russian footballers
Association football midfielders
FC Saturn Ramenskoye players
FC Znamya Truda Orekhovo-Zuyevo players
FC Chayka Peschanokopskoye players
FC Khimki players
Russian First League players
Russian Second League players
Russian Premier League players